The women's 800 metres event at the 2016 Summer Olympics took place between 17–20 August at the Olympic Stadium.

Summary
As the final started, Caster Semenya running in lane 3 gained a slight edge on the turn, deceptive as Margaret Wambui in lane 4 was the slowest around the turn.  Francine Niyonsaba converged from lane 5 and the two assumed the lead down the backstretch.  Semenya taking the curb as they began the turn, Niyonsaba on her outside shoulder with Maryna Arzamasava behind Niyonsaba, Melissa Bishop and Lynsey Sharp stacking up behind Semenya.  In the second 200, Margaret Wambui moved to the outside of lane 2 and ran up to Arzamasava's shoulder.  The first lap was an honest 57.59.  Midway through the penultimate turn, Niyonsaba edged in front of Semenya, the other runners collapsing into lane 1 rather than following her around the now open outside.  Down the backstretch, Niyonsaba opened a 2-metre lead, with Bishop cuing up tight behind Semenya, with Arzamasava boxing her to the outside, while Arzamasava was being boxed by a faster moving Wambui.  Kicker Joanna Jóźwik was trailing the field eight metres back of Niyonsaba.  After the final turn had started, Semenya drifted to the outside and put it in gear, moving from 2 metres behind Niyonsaba to 2 metres in front.  During the home stretch she just extended her lead to an 8-metre victory.  Still in second, Niyonsaba had a 2-metre gap on Bishop with Wambui on her outside.  Down the homestretch Niyonsaba also extended her gap to about four metres.  Wambui down a metre on the outside of Bishop, couldn't make any progress until the last 40 metres, when she  finally pulled aside and then past for the bronze medal by a metre.

For Semenya, her 1:55.28 was a new South African National Record, a .05 improvement over the mark she set a month earlier at Herculis.  For Bishop it was also a Canadian National Record, improving upon the mark she set the same day as Semenya in Edmonton.  Semenya becomes the fifth woman to win two medals in the Women's Olympic 800. Since the disqualification of Mariya Savinova from 2012, she has become the first two time gold medalist.

The medals were presented by Barbara Kendall, IOC member, New Zealand and Hamad Kalkaba Malboum, Vice President of the IAAF.

Testosterone
Following the race, Lynsey Sharp complained that female athletes are effectively competing in "two separate races."  Sharp, Melissa Bishop and Joanna Jozwik embraced after the race. "We see each other week in, week out, so we know how each other feel."

IAAF General Secretary Pierre Weisse said of Semenya, "She is a woman, but maybe not 100 per cent."

All three medalists have been found to have the 46,XY karyotype and produce levels of testosterone in the male range, which enables building of greater muscle mass and better processing of energy. The IAAF has subsequently ruled that this gives them an unfair advantage. On May 8, 2019, the IAAF testosterone rule went into effect. Such athletes will be required to take testosterone suppressing drugs in order to compete with female athletes.

Competition format
The women's 800m competition consisted of heats (Round 1), semifinals and a final. Twenty-four athletes advanced from the heats to the semifinal round. The top two competitors from each of the eight heats qualified for the semifinals along with the eight fastest losers. A total of eight competitors qualified for the final from the semifinals. In the three semifinal races, the first two from each semifinal advanced to the final along with the two fastest losers.

Records
, the existing World and Olympic records were as follows.

The following national records were established during the competition:

Schedule
All times are Brasilia Time (UTC-3)

Results

Heats 
Progression rules: First 2 in each heat (Q) and the next 8 fastest (q) advance to the Semifinals

Heat 1

Heat 2

Heat 3

Heat 4

Heat 5

Heat 6

Heat 7

Heat 8

Semifinals 
Progression rules: First 2 in each heat (Q) and the next 2 fastest (q) advance to the Final

Semifinal 1

Semifinal 2

Semifinal 3

Final

References

Women's 800 metres
2016
2016 in women's athletics
Women's events at the 2016 Summer Olympics
Sex verification in sports